is a Japanese shōjo manga series written and illustrated by Miki Aihara. It was serialized in Shogakukan's Bessatsu Shōjo Comic magazine, starting in 1994. Shogakukan later collected the individual chapters into five bound volumes from March 1995 to June 1996. Viz Media licensed the series for an English-language release in North America and published five volumes from July 2005 to July 2006.

Story
Mimori Kosaka is accepted into Meidai Attached High School, which is her dream school because of its fashionable uniforms. Mimori dreams of being cute and feminine and finding a boyfriend in high school. Although Mimori looks forward to enjoying her first year of high school, things do not go as planned. After befriending a girl named Nana, Mimori reunites with her childhood friend, Haruta. However, instead of being friendly towards Mimori, Haruta is seeking revenge against her. A love triangle also develops when Nana falls in love with Kazukita Kuniyasu, who is in love with Mimori. As Mimori only likes Haruta, things get complicated.

Characters
 
The heroine of the story and a classmate of Haruta Atsushi in elementary school. She fell in love with Haruta when they reunited in high school.
 
The hero of the story and a classmate of Mimori when they were in elementary school. He was known as 'Haru-chan' in elementary school since he looked like a girl back then. He also developed feelings for Mimori. Haruta becomes jealous when another boy gives Mimori his button at their graduation ceremony, and he believes he was betrayed by Mimori. After that, Haruta became a delinquent and changed his look after being "rejected" by Mimori. It is hinted that he likes Mimori because when she cuts her finger and Kuniyasu sucks her finger to relieve her pain, he gets mad at him.
 
Mimori's first friend in high school. She has been a very popular girl amongst the boys in school since junior high. She is madly in love with Kuniyasu and once dated a college student.
 
 A brainy and popular student who is also a playboy. Mimori is the first girl that he had actually fallen in love with, and he tries everything to make Mimori like him.
 
A friend of Kuniyasu since junior high. He is in love with Nana and tries very hard to win her heart.

Volumes

References

External links
 Tokyo Boys & Girls at Viz Media
 
 

1994 manga
Comedy anime and manga
Romance anime and manga
Shogakukan manga
Shōjo manga
Viz Media manga